The lake trout (Salvelinus namaycush) is a freshwater char living mainly in lakes in northern North America. Other names for it include mackinaw, namaycush, lake char (or charr), touladi, togue, and grey trout. In Lake Superior, it can also be variously known as siscowet, paperbelly and lean. The lake trout is prized both as a game fish and as a food fish.  Those caught with dark coloration may be called mud hens.

Taxonomy 
It is the only member of the subgenus Cristovomer, which is more derived than the subgenus Baione (the most basal clade of Salvelinus, containing the brook trout (S. fontinalis) and silver trout (S. agasizii)) but still basal to the other members of Salvelinus.

Range
From a zoogeographical perspective, lake trout have a relatively narrow distribution. They are native only to the northern parts of North America, principally Canada, but also Alaska and, to some extent, the northeastern United States. Lake trout have been widely introduced into non-native waters in North America and into many other parts of the world, mainly Europe, but also into South America and certain parts of Asia. Although lake trout were introduced into Yellowstone National Park's Shoshone, Lewis and Heart lakes legally in the 1890s, they were illegally or accidentally introduced into Yellowstone Lake in the 1980s where they are now considered invasive.

Description

Life history
Lake trout inhabit cold, oxygen-rich waters.

The lake trout is a slow-growing fish, typical of oligotrophic waters. It is also very late to mature. Populations are extremely susceptible to overfishing. Many native lake trout populations have been severely damaged through the combined effects of hatchery stocking (planting) and over harvest. Another threat to lake trout is acidification, which can have longterm effects on their populations through both direct harm and reduced prey populations (e.g. Mysis relicta).

There are three subspecies of lake trout. There is the common lake trout (Salvelinus namaycush namaycush), the siscowet lake trout (Salvelinus namaycush siscowet), and the less common rush lake trout (Salvelinus namaycush huronicus). Some lakes do not have pelagic forage fish during the period of summer stratification. In these lakes, lake trout act as planktivores. Lake trout in planktivorous populations are highly abundant, grow very slowly and mature at relatively small sizes. In those lakes that do contain deep-water forage, lake trout become piscivorous. Piscivorous lake trout grow much more quickly, mature at a larger size and are less abundant. Notwithstanding differences in abundance, the density of biomass of lake trout is fairly consistent in similar lakes, regardless of whether the lake trout populations they contain are planktivorous or piscivorous.

In Lake Superior, common lake trout (S. n. namaycush) and siscowet lake trout (S. n. siscowet) live together. Common lake trout tend to stay in shallower waters, while siscowet lake trout stay in deeper water. Common lake trout (also called "lean" lake trout) are slimmer than the relatively fat siscowet. Siscowet numbers have become greatly depressed over the years due to a combination of the extirpation of some of the fish's deep water coregonine prey and to overexploitation. Siscowet tend to grow extremely large and fat and attracted great commercial interest in the last century. Their populations have rebounded since 1970, with one estimate putting the number in Lake Superior at 100 million. Professor of Zoology at the University of Wisconsin-Madison James Kitchell credits effective constraint of commercial fisheries and persistent sea lamprey (Petromyzon marinus) control for the successful recovery of Lake Superior's lake trout. "Looking at what has happened in the lake and the results of computer simulations, it is clear that lamprey control needs to continue if Lake Superior is to keep its lake trout."

Hybrids
Lake trout are known to hybridize in nature with the brook trout; such hybrids, known as "splake", are normally sterile but self-sustaining populations exist in some lakes. Splake are also artificially propagated in hatcheries, and then stocked into lakes in an effort to provide sport-fishing opportunities.

Commercial fishing

Lake trout were fished commercially in the Great Lakes until lampreys, overharvest and pollution extirpated or severely reduced the stocks. Commercial fisheries still exist in some areas of the Great Lakes and smaller lakes in northern Canada. Commercial fishing by Ojibwe for Lake Trout in Lake Superior is permitted under various treaties and regulated by the Great Lakes Indian Fish & Wildlife Commission (GLIFWC).

Origin of name
The specific epithet namaycush derives from namekush, a form of the word used in some inland Southern East Cree communities in referring to this species of fish. Other variations found in East Cree are kûkamâs[h], kûkamâw and kûkamesh. Similar cognate words are found in Ojibwe: namegos = "lake trout"; namegoshens = "rainbow trout", literally meaning "little lake trout".

Popular culture
Geneva, New York claims the title "Lake Trout Capital of the World," and holds an annual lake trout fishing derby.

References

External links
Fishbase description of Lake trout

Lake trout
Freshwater fish of the United States
Freshwater fish of the Arctic
Lake fish of North America
Fish of the Great Lakes
Lake trout
Taxa named by Johann Julius Walbaum